Ren Jing is a Chinese former professional tennis player.

Inher career, Ren won one singles title and three doubles titles on the ITF Women's Circuit.
She reached the second round of the WTA Guangzhou event and lost in the first round as a qualifier of the WTA Tashkent tournament.

Her highest WTA singles ranking is 256, which she reached on 14 May 2007. Her career-high in doubles is 224, which she reached on 28 May 2007.

ITF Circuit finals

Singles (1–1)

Doubles (3–0)

External links
 
 

1987 births
Living people
Chinese female tennis players
21st-century Chinese women